Aalkistensee is a lake in Kraichgau, Baden-Württemberg, Germany. At an elevation of ca 250 m, its surface area is 0.136 km2.

Lakes of Baden-Württemberg